Philippe Moureaux (12 April 1939 – 15 December 2018) was a Belgian politician, senator, mayor of Molenbeek-Saint-Jean, and professor of economic history at the Université Libre de Bruxelles. He held the honorary title of Minister of State and was a member of the Order of Leopold II and the Order of Leopold.

Minister 
His first government post was a Minister of the Interior and Institutional Reform in the government of Wilfried Martens (Martens III) in 1980.

Resigning from the Federal Government in 1993, Moureaux's coalition defeated the incumbent mayor of Molenbeek  at the 1994 council elections. A key part of Moureaux's campaign, then and since, was the involvement of ethnic minorities in the campaign,  of Ecolo being the first Belgian of Moroccan origin elected in Molenbeek. In 2004, as a senator, Moureaux submitted the law granting the right of foreigners to vote in municipal elections.

However, Moureaux's attempts at revitalizing the municipality were not successful. An example was the withdrawal of BBDO in June 2011 from the town. In an open letter addressed to Moureaux, ten employees of this American advertising agency cited over 150 attacks on their staff by locals as principal reason for their departure. As a result, serious questions have been raised about governance, security, and the administration of Mayor Moureaux.

Honours 
 3 December 1987 : Commander in the Order of Leopold.
 19 May 1995 : Knight Grand cross in the Order of Leopold II.

Select bibliography 
Les comptes d'une société charbonnière à la fin de l'Ancien Régime (La société de Redemont à Haine-St-Pierre - La Hestre). Brussels, Palais des Académies, 1969. 248 p., illustrated, (Commission Royale d'Histoire).

References

External links

New York Times article on role of Phillipe Moureaux in Molenbeeck radicalization

|-

1939 births
2018 deaths
People from Uccle
Belgian Ministers of Justice
Ministers-President of the French Community of Belgium
Belgian Ministers of State
Mayors of places in Belgium
Members of the Senate (Belgium)
People from Etterbeek
People from Molenbeek-Saint-Jean
Socialist Party (Belgium) politicians

Recipients of the Grand Cross of the Order of Leopold II
21st-century Belgian politicians